Dayane Amaral (born ) is a Brazilian group rhythmic gymnast. She represents her nation at international competitions. She competed at world championships, including at the 2011  World Rhythmic Gymnastics Championships.

References

1993 births
Living people
Brazilian rhythmic gymnasts
Place of birth missing (living people)
Gymnasts at the 2011 Pan American Games
Gymnasts at the 2015 Pan American Games
Pan American Games gold medalists for Brazil
Pan American Games silver medalists for Brazil
Pan American Games medalists in gymnastics
Medalists at the 2011 Pan American Games
Medalists at the 2015 Pan American Games